The Windtech Coral is a Spanish single-place paraglider that was designed and produced by Windtech Parapentes of Gijón. It is now out of production.

Design and development
The aircraft was designed as a beginner glider for school flight training use. The models are each named for their approximate wing area in square metres.

The design features pitch control stability to simplify beginner ground handling. Also the cells decrease in width towards the wing tips to improve turn co-ordination.

The glider wing is made from Porcher Marine Skytex 44 g/m2 nylon fabric. The rib reinforcements are 310 g/m2 Dacron, with the trailing edge reinforcement fabricated of 175 g/m2 polyester. The lines are all sheathed Kevlar of 1.1 and 1.7 mm in diameter. The risers are made from 25 mm wide polyester strapping.

Variants
Coral 27
Small-sized model for lighter pilots. The glider model is Deutscher Hängegleiterverband e.V. (DHV) 1 certified.
Coral 29
Mid-sized model for medium-weight pilots. The glider model is DHV 1 certified.
Coral 32
Large-sized model for heavier pilots. The glider model is DHV 1 certified.

Specifications (Coral 29)

References

External links

Coral
Paragliders